Amami Japanese (トン普通語) is a variety of the Japanese language spoken on the island of Amami Ōshima. Its native term  means "potato standard". Much like Okinawan Japanese, it's a descendant of Standard Japanese but with influences from the traditional Ryukyuan languages (in this case, Amami Japanese is influenced by the Amami Ōshima language).

History 
In the past, the locals of Amami Ōshima spoke the Amami Ōshima language, which belongs to the northern group of the larger Ryukyuan language family. However, as a result of Japanese assimilation policies, a language shift towards Japanese began. The same occurrence happened in the other parts of the Ryukyu Islands.

Despite Japanese becoming widespread in Amami Ōshima, a substrate from the Amami language was present. Amami Japanese was looked down upon for much of its existence. However, in modern times, the variety is viewed positively by its speakers.

Features 

The last two English examples are not words on their own. They instead list the situations in which the Amami Japanese words are used.  indicates a quote, and the word  marks a question when placed at the end of a phrase.

See also 

 Japanese language
 Okinawan Japanese, the equivalent of Amami Japanese spoken on the Okinawa Islands
 Amami Ōshima language, the language that influenced this variety of Japanese
 Amami Ōshima, the island where  is spoken

References 

Amami Islands
Japanese dialects